Kunzea occidentalis is a flowering plant in the myrtle family, Myrtaceae and is endemic to a western New South Wales. It is a shrub with narrow leaves and small groups of white flowers on leafy side-branches. It is distinguished from the similar Kunzea ambigua by the flanges on the sides of its young branches.

Description
The flowers are arranged singly or in groups of up to six near the ends of the branches. Flowering occurs in October and November.

Taxonomy and naming
Kunzea occidentalis was first formally described in 2016 by Hellmut R. Toelken and the description was published in Journal of the Adelaide Botanic Garden. The specific epithet (occidentalis) is a Latin word meaning "western" referring to the distribution of this species on the western side of the Great Dividing Range.

Distribution and habitat
This kunzea grows in heath and forest, mainly in rocky places and in creek beds. It is found on the western slopes of the Great Dividing Range and is common in the Warrumbungle and Mount Kaputar national parks.

References

occidentalis
Flora of New South Wales
Myrtales of Australia
Plants described in 2016
Endemic flora of Australia
Taxa named by Hellmut R. Toelken